Le Jardin Academy is located on the Windward Side of Oahu in City and County of Honolulu, Hawaii. It offers private education from Pre-K to grade 12.

It has a Kailua address but is not in the Kailua census-designated place.

History
Madame Henriette D. Neal founded a preschool in 1961 at St John's Lutheran Church in Kailua, originally known as Le Jardin d'Enfants. Madame Neal taught her students the French language. French is still taught at the school today and the fleur-de-lis appears in Le Jardin's logo. Chinese, French, Japanese, and Spanish language are also offered to students.

After 1961 and for the next eight years, a new grade was added nearly every year. By 1975, the school's enrollment was more than 100 students, all in sixth grade or lower.  In 1992 Le Jardin Academy merged with Windward Preparatory School, a small "Jr. Kindergarten through Jr. High" school located in Kailua, HI, and enrollment reached 462 students.

On August 30, 1999, the school opened its new campus on the former site of the Kailua Drive-In theater, which had closed in 1991.  The Harold K.L. Castle Foundation donated this 24-acre site for the new Le Jardin Academy main campus. In 2001, Le Jardin added a high school in the same manner it had expanded in the 1960s, by adding a new grade each year, and in 2006 Le Jardin Academy celebrated its first high school graduating class.  In 2009, a new high school building and gym was added to the main campus.

References

External links
 Le Jardin Academy website

1961 establishments in Hawaii
Educational institutions established in 1961
Private K-12 schools in Honolulu County, Hawaii
Schools accredited by the Western Association of Schools and Colleges
International Baccalaureate schools in Hawaii